The governor of Surigao del Sur, is the chief executive of the provincial government of Surigao del Sur.

Provincial Governors (1987-2025)

References

Governors of Surigao del Sur
Surigao del Sur